The siege of Grave, also known as the capture of Grave of 1586, took place from mid-February to 7 June 1586 at Grave, Duchy of Brabant, Low Countries (present-day the Netherlands), between the Spanish army led by Governor-General Don Alexander Farnese, Prince of Parma, and the Dutch-States and English forces under Baron Peter van Hemart, Governor of Grave, during the Eighty Years' War and the Anglo-Spanish War (1585–1604).

Events 
Alexander Farnese wanted to In February of 1586, the Count Peter Ernst of Mansfeld, by order of Alexander Farnese, laid siege to the town of Grave. After little more than a month, and the impossibility of the English and Dutch forces relieving the city, Grave surrendered to the Spaniards on 7 June. The capture of the strategically important town of Grave by Parma, and the impotence of the English commander Sir Robert Dudley, Earl of Leicester, to relieve the town, in a time where England had raised hopes to the Dutch rebels thanks to the Treaty of Nonsuch, was a complete military and political success for the Spanish authorities, and a severe blow for the Protestant cause, provoking the start of the disagreements of the States-General of the Netherlands with the Earl of Leicester.

A few days later, the Spanish army, commanded by the Prince of Parma, laid siege to Venlo, garrisoned and supported by Dutch and English troops led by Maarten Schenck and Sir Roger Williams. On 28 June 1586 the garrison was forced to capitulate to the Spaniards.

See also
 Battle of Empel
 Battle of Boksum
 Siege of Venlo (1586)
 Destruction of Neuss
 Treaty of Nonsuch

Notes

References
 Darby, Graham. The Origins and Development of the Dutch Revolt. First published 2001. London. 
 Black, Jeremy. European Warfare 1494-1660. Routledge Publishing 2002. 
 Motley, John Lothrop. History of the United Netherlands: from the death of William the Silent to the Synod of Dort. Rotterdam 1872.
* David Hume & John Lingard. The History of * Giménez Martín, Juan. Tercios de Flandes. Ediciones Falcata Ibérica. First edition 1999, Madrid.  
England: From the Invasion of Julius Caesar to the Revolution in 1688. Vol II. Philadelphia 1859.
 Tracy, J.D. (2008). The Founding of the Dutch Republic: War, Finance, and Politics in Holland 1572–1588. Oxford University Press.

External links
 Tercios de Flandes by Juan Giménez Martín 

Grave
1586 in the Dutch Republic
1586 in the Habsburg Netherlands
16th-century military history of the Kingdom of England
16th-century military history of Spain
Grave (1586)
Eighty Years' War (1566–1609)
Grave (1586)
Grave (1586)
Grave (1586)
Grave (1586)
Grave
History of Land van Cuijk